Peter Cetera, released in September  1981, is the self-titled first solo release by American musician Peter Cetera, released while he was the bassist and lead vocalist of the band Chicago.

A much more rock-oriented album than the disco-influenced music Chicago had been producing at the time, Cetera released the album in September 1981 while still a member of the band. Released on Full Moon Records, a subsidiary of Warner Brothers (reissued in 2004 on Wounded Bird Records), the album was not commercially successful, peaking at number 143 on the Billboard 200 chart in March 1982, after making its first appearance on the Billboard 200 chart on January 23, 1982 at number 192. However, it is notable because Cetera is the sole writer of all songs on the album save one—"I Can Feel It," which Cetera co-wrote with Ricky Fataar and Carl Wilson. Wilson, a member of the Beach Boys and a friend of Cetera's, also played guitar on the song. The single "Livin' in the Limelight," the only hit from the album, was released on November 18, 1981, and charted at number six in the Billboard Mainstream Rock.

One year after Peter Cetera was released, Cetera and Chicago launched a major comeback with the number one single, "Hard to Say I'm Sorry", and album, Chicago 16. After 1984's Chicago 17 was also a massive hit, Cetera left the band to concentrate fully on his solo career. The song, "On the Line", which appears on this album, was on the B-side of the 45 RPM single of Cetera's first number one song as a solo performer in 1986, "Glory of Love".

Production
The album was produced by Cetera and Jim Boyer and was recorded digitally.

Artwork and packaging
The painting of Cetera playing the bass guitar, used for the album cover, was by John Nieto. Contemporary artist Nieto is known for his use of vibrant, electric hues and bold strokes in his paintings. The photograph of Cetera on the dust cover inside was by Diane Nini.

Release, promotion, marketing
When Columbia Records dropped Chicago in 1981, Cetera was in the middle of recording his first solo album for the same label. He had to personally buy the rights to the album before it could be released. According to Cetera, Chicago's new record company, Warner Bros., released the Peter Cetera album while it was waiting for Chicago 16 to be released. Cetera has asserted that one reason for the album's poor commercial success, however, was lack of support from the record company: the record company didn't want it to be successful and didn't promote it for fear that he would leave the group. In his 2011 autobiography, former Chicago bandmate, Danny Seraphine, backs up Cetera on this point, writing, "... [the album] sank like a stone due to lack of record company support. Warner Brothers didn't want it to interfere with their plans for Chicago." A full-page advertisement announcing the album appeared on page 100 of the November 21, 1981 issue of Billboard magazine.

Songs and personnel
All songs written by Peter Cetera, except where noted.

Side One

1. "Livin' in the Limelight" – 4:20
 Steve Lukather – lead guitar and solo
 Craig Hull – 2nd guitar
 Mike Botts – drums
 Michael Boddicker – synthesizer
 Peter Cetera –  bass, percussion
2. "I Can Feel It" (Cetera, Ricky Fataar, Carl Wilson) – 3:07
 Chris Pinnick – lead guitar and solo
 Carl Wilson – 2nd guitar
 Ricky Fataar – drums
 Mark Williams  – percussion
 Peter Cetera – bass
3. "How Many Times" – 4:21
 Chris Pinnick – 1st guitar
 Rich Eames – electric piano
 David "Hawk" Wolinski – synthesizer and solo
 Ricky Fataar – drums
 Steve Foreman – percussion
 Peter Cetera – bass, acoustic guitar
4. "Holy Moly" – 4:25
 Chris Pinnick – electric guitar
 Steve Lukather – electric guitar
 Ricky Fataar – drums, percussion
 Tommy Morgan – harmonica and solo
 Peter Cetera – bass, acoustic guitar
5. "Mona Mona" – 3:18
 Chris Pinnick – 1st guitar
 Ricky Fataar – drums
 Gary Herbig – saxophone
 David "Hawk" Wolinski – synthesizer
 Peter Cetera – bass, 2nd guitar
Side Two

6. "On the Line" – 4:00
 Josh Leo – electric guitar and solo
 Craig Hull – electric guitar
 Kenny Edwards – acoustic guitar
 Bob Glaub – bass
 Craig Doerge – piano
 Michael Botts – drums
 Michael Boddicker – synthesizers
 Peter Cetera – percussion
7. "Not Afraid to Cry" – 3:27
 Chris Pinnick – electric 6-string guitar
 Mark Goldenberg – acoustic 12-string guitar and solo
 Ricky Fataar – drums
 Peter Cetera – bass, percussion
8. "Evil Eye" – 2:37
 Chris Pinnick – guitar, 12-string guitar
 Mark Goldenberg – 12-string guitar
 Ricky Fataar – drums
 Peter Cetera  – bass, synthesizer
9. "Practical Man" – 4:49
 Chris Pinnick – guitar
 Craig Hull – guitar
 William "Smitty" Smith – organ
 David "Hawk" Wolinski  – synthesizers
 Ricky Fataar – drums
 Peter Cetera  – bass, percussion, vocorder, synthesizer
 Horns – written by Peter Cetera; arranged by Roland Vazquez
10. "Ivy Covered Walls" – 3:56
 Chris Pinnick – guitar and solo
 Carli Munoz – piano
 Ricky Fataar – drums
 Peter Cetera – bass, percussion 
Song listing and personnel from vinyl LP liner notes.

Song times from vinyl LP label.

Notes

References

1981 debut albums
Peter Cetera albums
Albums produced by Jim Boyer (audio engineer)
Full Moon Records albums
Warner Records albums